Monimia is a genus of trees of the family Monimiaceae the major group of Angiosperms (Flowering plants). It is endemic to the Mascarene Islands and comprises three species.

Species
 Monimia amplexicaulis Lorence Réunion
 Monimia ovalifolia Thouars Mauritius, Réunion
 Monimia rotundifolia Thouars Réunion

References

Monimiaceae
Monimiaceae genera
Flora of Réunion
Endemic flora of the Mascarene Islands
Flora of Mauritius